Armin Weier (born 27 July 1956) is a German wrestler. He competed in the men's freestyle 82 kg at the 1980 Summer Olympics.

References

External links
 

1956 births
Living people
German male sport wrestlers
Olympic wrestlers of East Germany
Wrestlers at the 1980 Summer Olympics
People from Loitz
Sportspeople from Mecklenburg-Western Pomerania